The International Journal of Sports Marketing & Sponsorship is a quarterly peer-reviewed academic journal covering issues related to the marketing of sports that was established in 1999. Since 2004 it has been published  by International Marketing Reports. The journal is abstracted and indexed by PsycINFO and the Social Sciences Citation Index. It is currently published by the Emerald Publishing Group.

Special issues
The journal has published special issues on such subjects as football (soccer), technology, Olympics, NASCAR, and scandal & corruption in sport, as well as issues featuring specific markets such as Australia/New Zealand and Latin America.

Editors
Past editors of the journal are:
2008: Michel Desbordes
2004: Simon Chadwick
2002: David Shani
1999: John Amis

References

External links
 

Quarterly journals
Publications established in 1999
English-language journals
Business and management journals
Sociology of sport journals
Sports marketing
Emerald Group Publishing academic journals